Conceição is a municipality (município) in the state of Paraíba in Brazil. The population is 19,007 (2020 est.) in an area of 579 km². It is part of the microregion of Itaporanga.

References

Municipalities in Paraíba